The 2014–15 season are the Esteghlal Football Club's 14th season in the Persian Gulf Pro League, and their 21st consecutive season in the top division of Iranian football. They are also competing in the Hazfi Cup and 70th year in existence as a football club.

Club

Coaching staff

Other information

|-

First team squad
Last updated: 14 June 2015

Iran Pro League squad

 (c)

 U21 = Under 21 Player
 U23 = Under 23 Player

New contracts

Transfers

In

Summer

Winter

Out

Summer

Winter

Loan in

Summer

Loan out

Summer

Winter

Competitions

Overall

Note: Current Position/Round Only use for team still a part of Competition.

Competition record

Persian Gulf Pro League

Standings

Results summary

Results by round

Matches

Hazfi Cup

Friendlies

Pre-season

Shohada tournament

During season

Statistics

Appearances and goals 

|-
! colspan="12" style="background:#dcdcdc; text-align:center;"| Goalkeepers
|-

|-
! colspan="12" style="background:#dcdcdc; text-align:center;"| Defenders
|-

|-

|-

|-

|-

|-

|-

|-
! colspan="12" style="background:#dcdcdc; text-align:center;"| Midfielders
|-

|-

|-

|-

|-

|-
! colspan="12" style="background:#dcdcdc; text-align:center;"| Strikers
|-

|-

|-

|-

|-
|colspan="14"|Players sold or loaned out or retired after the start of the season:
|-

|-

|-

|-

|-

|}

Starting 11
Considering starts in all competitions.

{| class="infobox" style="width:180px;"
|-
|
|

Disciplinary record
Includes all competitive matches. Players with 1 card or more included only.

{| class="wikitable" style="font-size: 95%; text-align: center;"
|-
!rowspan="2" style="width:5%;"|No.
!rowspan="2" style="width:5%;"|Nat.
!rowspan="2" style="width:5%;"|Position
!rowspan="2" style="width:20%;"|Name
!colspan=3|Iran Pro League
!colspan=3|Hazfi Cup
!colspan=3|Total
|-
!width=60 |
!width=60 |
!width=60 |
!width=60 |
!width=60 |
!width=60 |
!width=60 |
!width=60 |
!width=60 |
|-
|34||||DF||Milad Fakhreddini||8||0||0||0||0||0||8||0||0
|-
|13||||MF||Karrar Jassim||4||1||0||0||0||0||4||1||0
|-
|14||||MF||Andranik Teymourian||3||0||0||2||0||0||5||0||0
|-
|3||||DF||Mohammad Reza Khorsandnia||2||0||0||1||0||0||3||0||0
|-
|4||||DF||Amir Hossein Sadeghi||2||0||0||1||0||0||3||0||0
|-
|2||||DF||Khosro Heydari||1||0||0||2||0||0||3||0||0
|-
|16||||DF||Hashem Beikzadeh||3||0||0||0||0||0||3||0||0
|-
|9||||FW||Arash Borhani||2||0||0||0||0||0||2||0||0
|-
|11||||FW||Mohammad Ghazi||1||0||0||1||0||0||2||0||0
|-
|10||||FW||Sajjad Shahbazzadeh||1||0||0||0||1||0||1||1||0
|-
|6||||MF||Omid Ebrahimi||1||0||0||0||0||0||1||0||0
|-
|19||||MF||Alireza Ramezani||1||0||0||0||0||0||1||0||0
|-
|29||||FW||Milad Soleiman Fallah||1||0||0||0||0||0||1||0||0
|-
|17||||MF||Yaghoub Karimi||0||0||0||1||0||0||1||0||0
|-
|5||||DF||Hanif Omranzadeh||1||0||0||0||0||0||1||0||0
|-
|colspan="4"| TOTALS
|31
|0
|0
|8
|1
|0
|39
|2
|0
|-

Top scorers
The list is sorted by shirt number when total goals are equal.
{| class="wikitable sortable" style="font-size: 95%; text-align: center;"
|-
!width=20|
!width=20|
!width=20|
!width=200|Player
!width=50|Pro League
!width=50|Hazfi Cup
!width=50|Total
|-
|rowspan="1"|1
|FW
|10
|align=left| Sajjad Shahbazzadeh
|12||1||13
|-
|rowspan="1"|2
|MF
|6
|align=left| Omid Ebrahimi
|9||0||9
|-
|rowspan="2"|3
|FW
|11
|align=left| Mohammad Ghazi
|4||1||5
|-
|MF
|13
|align=left| Karrar Jassim
|3||3||6
|-
|rowspan="1"|5
|FW
|9
|align=left| Arash Borhani
|2||1||3
|-
|rowspan="8"|6
|DF
|2
|align=left| Khosro Heydari
|1||0||1
|-
|DF
|4
|align=left| Amir Hossein Sadeghi
|1||0||1
|-
|MF
|16
|align=left| Hashem Beikzadeh
|1||0||1
|-
|MF
|17
|align=left| Yaghob Karimi
|1||0||1
|-
|MF
|19
|align=left| Alireza Ramezani
|0||1||1
|-
|MF
|23
|align=left| Mehdi Karimian
|1||0||1
|-
|DF
|34
|align=left| Milad Fakhreddini
|1||0||1
|-
|FW
|80
|align=left| Reza Enayati
|1||0||1
|-
|colspan="4"|TOTALS
|33
|7
|40
|-

Top Assister
The list is sorted by shirt number when total goals are equal.
{| class="wikitable sortable" style="font-size: 95%; text-align: center;"
|-
!width=20|
!width=20|
!width=20|
!width=200|Player
!width=50|Pro League
!width=50|Hazfi Cup
!width=50|Total
|-
|rowspan="1"|1
|MF
|13
|align=left| Karrar Jassim
|8||2||10
|-
|rowspan="2"|2
|DF
|2
|align=left| Khosro Heydari
|4||0||4
|-
|MF
|17
|align=left| Yaghoub Karimi
|3||1||4
|-
|rowspan="1"|4
|FW
|9
|align=left| Arash Borhani
|2||1||3
|-
|rowspan="1"|5
|FW
|10
|align=left| Sajjad Shahbazzadeh
|2||0||2
|-
|rowspan="3"|6
|DF
|5
|align=left| Hanif Omranzadeh
|1||0||1
|-
|MF
|19
|align=left| Alireza Ramezani
|1||0||1
|-
|DF
|34
|align=left| Milad Fakhreddini
|1||0||1
|-
|colspan="4"|TOTALS
|22
|4
|26
|-

Goals conceded 
{| class="wikitable" style="font-size: 95%; text-align: center;"
|-
!width=60|Position
!width=60|Nation
!width=60|Number
!width=200|Name
!width=80|Pro League
!width=80|Hazfi Cup
!width=80|Total
!width=80|Minutes per goal
|-
|GK
|
|1
|Mohsen Forouzan
|23 
|4 
|27 
| min 
|-
|GK
|
|12
|Alberto Rafael da Silva
|0 
|0 
|0 
| min 
|-
|GK
|
|21
|Farzin Garousian
|0 
|0 
|0 
| min 
|-
|GK
|
|30
|Vahid Talebloo
|0 
|0 
|0 
| min 
|-
| colspan="4"| TOTALS
|23 
|4 
|27 
| min 
|-

Overall statistics
{|class="wikitable" style="text-align: center;"
|-
!
!colspan="3" width="3"|Total
!colspan="3" width="3"|Home
!colspan="3" width="3"|Away
|-
!
!Pro League
!Hazfi Cup
!Total
!Pro League
!Hazfi Cup
!Total
!Pro League
!Hazfi Cup
!Total
|-
|align=left| Games played || 16 || 3 || 19 || 8 || 1 || 9 || 8 || 2 || 10
|-
|align=left| Games won || 8 || 2 || 10 || 5 || 1 || 6 || 3 || 1 || 4
|-
|align=left| Games drawn || 3 || 1 || 4 || 2 || 0 || 2 || 1 || 1 || 2
|-
|align=left| Games lost || 5 || 0 || 5 || 2 || 0 || 2 || 3 || 0 || 3
|-
|align=left| Biggest win || 3–0 || 4–2 || 3–0 || 3–0 || 4–2 || 3–0 || 3–0 || 1–0 || 3–0
|-
|align=left| Biggest loss || 3–1 || N/A || 3–1 || 2–1 || N/A || 2–1 || 3–1 || N/A || 3–1
|-
|align=left| Clean sheets || 5 || 1 || 6 || 3 || 0 || 3 || 2 || 1 || 3
|-
|align=left| Goals scored || 25 || 7 || 32 || 13 || 4 || 17 || 12 || 3 || 15
|-
|align=left| Goals conceded || 18 || 4 || 22 || 7 || 2 || 9 || 11 || 2 || 13
|-
|align=left| Goal difference || +7 || +3 || +10 || +6 || +2 || +8 || +1 || +1 || +2
|-
|-
|-
|align=left| Points || 27/48 (%) || 7/9 (%) || 34/57 (%) || 19/24 (%) || 3/3 (%) || 22/27 (%) || 8/24 (%) || 4/6 (%) || 12/30 (%)
|-
|align=left| Winning rate || % || % || % || % || % || % || % || % || %
|-
|align=left| Most appearances || 16 || 3 || 19 ||  align=left colspan=3|  Mohsen Forouzan
|-
|align=left| Most minutes played || 1440 || 330 || 1770 || align=left colspan=3|  Mohsen Forouzan
|-
|align=left| Top scorer || 7 || 1 || 8 || align=left colspan=3| Sajjad Shahbazzadeh
|-
|align=left| Top assister || 5 || 2 || 7 || align=left colspan=3| Karrar Jassim
|-

See also
 2014–15 Iran Pro League
 2014–15 Hazfi Cup

References

External links
 Iran Premier League Statistics
 Persian League

Esteghlal F.C. seasons
Esteghlal